Samir Shah, CBE (born January 1952) is a British television and radio executive. He has worked for London Weekend Television, the BBC, and is the chief executive of Juniper TV, a British company.

Early life and education 
Samir Shah was born in Aurangabad, India, to Amrit Shah and Uma Bakaya. He moved to England in 1960 and attended Latymer Upper School in West London. He has a Geography degree from Hull University and a doctorate from Oxford University (St Catherine's College)

Broadcasting 
Shah joined London Weekend Television in 1979, where he was to work with two significant figures in his career, John Birt, who was later to be director-general of the BBC, and Michael Wills, from whom he was to purchase Juniper TV.  In 1987, he was appointed BBC's head of television current affairs and, from 1994 to 1998 was head of the BBC’s political journalism programmes. Shah has said that his decision to leave the BBC for the commercial world was influenced by a significantly long and expensive executives residential course provisioned by the London Business School which  "incredibly useful and covered proper, grown- up things";  "the importance of obvious stuff like talking to the people who work for you"; and "it is perfectly possible to make better programmes for less cost". The downside was having experienced a feel for the commercial world the course was "quite significant" choosing to move on from the BBC.

In 1998, Shah purchased Juniper TV from Wills on the latter's appointment as a member of parliament, since when he had operated as CEO and creative director. its programmes have been broadcast on the BBC, Channel 4, National Geographic, Discovery, TLC, Netflix.

Shah's appointment as one of the then three non-executive directors of the BBC in 2007 led to a potential conflict of interest as Juniper was supplying programmes to the BBC, with Greenslade in 2007 reporting Shah "steps out if the board touches on any area that might affect his business expertise in broadcasting is considered. Shah was involved in advising director-general Mark Thompson over the Crowngate affair which resulted in BBC1 controller Peter Fincham resigning from the BBC.  Shah was reported as claiming in 2008 that "One BBC ethos" presented a "monolithic posture that makes it appear anti competitive".

Boards and appointments 
Arts and Heritage: Deputy Chair (2012-2014) & Trustee (2005–2014) of the V&A; Chair of the Museum of the  Home (2014-); member of the Cultural Recovery Board (2020-2021); and of the Heritage Advisory Board (2020).
Media: Non-Executive Director of the BBC Board (2007-2010); member of the Future of public service broadcasting (2021); Board member, BAFTA; Chair of One World Media (2020 -)
Multicultural: Commissioner on Government Commission on Race and Ethnic Disparities; Chair of the Runnymede Trust (1999-2009); Member, PM’s Holocaust Commission (2014 – 2015).
Academic: 2019 Visiting Professor of Creative Media, Oxford University (Faculty of English), 2006 - 2017 Special Professor, University of Nottingham

Honours and accolades 
In 1999 Shah was awarded an OBE for services to Equal opportunities in Broadcasting.  He was elected a Fellow of the Royal Television Society in 2002, and in 2019 was awarded a CBE for services to heritage and television. The Guardian in June 2008 referred to Shah as “one of the most successful figures in modern British broadcasting”. February 2022 saw Shah bestowed with an Outstanding Contribution Award by the Royal Television Society for services over 40 years and commitment to diversity in television journalism.

Works

References

Footnotes

Sources
 
 
 
 
 
 
 
 
 
 
 
 </ref>

External links
 

Living people
BBC executives
1952 births
People from Aurangabad, Maharashtra
Alumni of the University of Hull
Alumni of St Catherine's College, Oxford
People educated at Latymer Upper School